The Canada national Australian rules football team represents Canada in Australian rules football. The men's side is known as the Northwind while the women's side is known as the Northern Lights. 
The national team is selected by AFL Canada the governing body for Australian rules football in Canada.

Northwind players are selected from the best Canadian-born players from the club teams across Canada.

The team plays in international tournaments, including the Australian Football International Cup and the 49th Parallel Cup.

Identity
The Northwind's guernsey has the Maple leaf, the floral emblem of Canada, in the national colours of red and white.

History
The team formed to participate in the Australian Football International Cup in 2002 (finishing 9th) 2005 (finishing 7th) and 2008 (finishing 6th) as well as exhibition matches against other countries.

Between 1993–1995, the Northwind were undefeated in tests against the British Australian Rules Football League.

Notable players
Stefan Leyhane, Northwind's Captain (2003–2009) was also the only Canadian recipient of the 2002 International All Star Team.

Northwind's best and fairest player (from the 2005 International Cup) was Paul Loughnane.

Northwind's best and fairest player from the 2008 International Cup was Aaron "Azza" Falcioni.

Northwind had two players named to the 2008 World Team: Emanuel Matata at Ruckman, and Scott Fleming at Forward.

Northwind had one player named to the 2011 World Team: Steve Rutledge.

Northwind had two players named to the 2014 World Team: Nathan Strom and Neil Casey.

Northwind had one player named to the 2017 World Team: Eric Klein

Australian Football International Cup

The Northwind have competed at the Australian Football International Cup since their first appearance in 2002. The International Cup is a competition where players that are citizens of the countries who are competing are the only players allowed to play (no expatriate Australians are permitted to play, with teams composed solely of amateurs who must be nationals of the country they represent).

In the 2002 Australian Football International Cup the Canada Northwind finished 9th of 11 teams.
Round 1: Ireland 7.14 (56) def. Canada 4.7 (31) - Trevor Barker Beach Oval, Sandringham, Melbourne
Round 2: Canada 4.11 (38) def. South Africa 1.5 (11)  
Round 3: New Zealand 10.8 (68) def. Canada 2.6 (18) 
Round 4: USA 8.4 (52) def. Canada 1.1 (7) 
Round 5: Samoa 9.15 (69) def. Canada 0.5 (5) 
9th/10th Place Playoff: Canada 6.5 (41) def. Japan 5.2 (32) 

In the 2005 Australian Football International Cup the Northwind finished 7th of 10 teams.
Round 1: Ireland 4.7 (31) def. Canada 3.5 (23)
Round 2: Papua New Guinea 5.11 (41) def. Canada 4.3 (27)
Round 3: Samoa 7.4 (46) def. Canada 6.6 (42)
Round 4: Great Britain 3.7 (25) def. 3.5 Canada (23)  
Qualifying Final: Canada def. Spain  (Spain forfeited).
7th/8th Place Playoff: Canada 4.5 (29) def. South Africa 2.6 (18) 

In the 2008 Australian Football International Cup the Northwind finished 6th of 16 teams:
Round 1: Canada Northwind 18.22 (130) def. Finland Icebreakers 0.0 (0) - Western Oval
Round 2: Canada Northwind 16.12 (108) def. Sweden Elks 1.1 (7) - Ransford Oval
Round 3: Ireland Warriors 4.6 (30) def. Canada Northwind 2.2 (14) - Reid Oval
Finals Round 1: Canada Northwind 7.7 (49) def. Japan Samurais 0.3 (3) - Walter Oval 
5th/6th Place Playoff: Nauru Chiefs 12.8 (80) def. Canada Northwind 7.7 (49) - Ransford Oval  

In the 2011 Australian Football International Cup the Northwind finished 10th of 18 teams
Group 6 - Match 1: Canada 2.0 (12) def. by United States 2.3 (15) - Blacktown International Sportspark 2 
Group 6 - Match 2: Canada 3.6 (24) def.  Peres Team for Peace 0.0 (0) - Blacktown International Sportspark 2 
Division 1 - Group 1 - Match 1: Canada 2.3 (15) def. by Great Britain 6.8 (44) - Blacktown International Sportspark 2 
Division 1 - Group 1 - Match 3:  Canada 3.2 (20) def. by New Zealand 5.9 (39) - Blacktown International Sportspark 1 
Division 1 Semi-Finals: Canada 13.8 (86) def.  Japan 2.1 (13) - McAllister Oval 
9th/10th Place Playoff: Canada 6.4 (40) def. by Tonga 6.10 (46) - Ransford Oval 

In the 2014 Australian Football International Cup the Northwind finished 5th of 18 teams. 
Pool C - Round 1: Canada 19.5 (119) def. China 0.1 (1) - McAlister Oval
Pool C - Round 2: Canada 2.8 (20) def. by USA 8.3 (51) - Ransford Oval
Pool C - Round 3: Canada 20.10 (130) def. Sweden 0.0 (0)  - Ben Kavanagh Reserve
Division 1 Semi Finals:  Canada 9.15 (69) def. France 2.3 (15) - Ransford Oval
Division 1 Championship (5th/6th Place Playoff): Canada 9.7 (61) def. Tonga 7.6 (48) - McAlister Oval

2005 International Cup squad

See also
AFL Canada
Australian Rules Football in Canada
Australian Football International Cup

References

External links
AFL Canada – Northwind

Australian rules football in Canada
Canada
Australian rules football